Dellamora gregis is a species of beetle in the genus Dellamora. It was discovered in 1948.

References

Mordellidae
Beetles described in 1948